William Benjamin Devonshire (19722017) was a male weightlifter who competed for England.

Weightlifting career
Devonshire represented England and won a bronze medal in the 59 kg clean and jerk division, at the 1994 Commonwealth Games in Victoria.

Personal  life
He was a detective constable for the Cambridgeshire Police by trade. He died in 2017.

References

English male weightlifters
Commonwealth Games medallists in weightlifting
Commonwealth Games bronze medallists for England
Weightlifters at the 1994 Commonwealth Games
1972 births
2017 deaths
Medallists at the 1994 Commonwealth Games